A Biography of the Rev. Absalom Dawe is a solo album by the English saxophonist John Surman, recorded in 1994 and released on the ECM label.

Reception
The Penguin Guide to Jazz Recordings included the album in its suggested “core collection” of essential recordings.

The AllMusic review by Stacia Proefrock stated: "John Surman is an artist with an amazing range and depth of style, from contemporary classical to jazz to electronic music. In few places is this more evident than on A Biography of the Rev. Absalom Dawe, on which Surman acts as a sort of one-man wind chamber ensemble... Elements of modern composition, jazz, and European folk can be heard throughout and the mood is one of reflection and wintry quiet. Overall, this is one of Surman's most daring and yet most successful projects to date".

Track listing
All compositions by John Surman.

 "First Light" – 2:45
 "Countless Journeys" – 7:34
 "A Monastic Calling" – 5:55
 "Druid's Circle" – 2:46
 "'Twas But Piety" – 7:23
 "Three Aspects" – 2:53
 "The Long Narrow Road" – 2:51
 "Wayfarer" – 9:31
 "The Far Corners" – 6:37
 "An Image" – 1:25

Personnel
John Surman – soprano saxophone, baritone saxophone, bass clarinet, alto clarinet, keyboards

References

1995 albums
Albums produced by Manfred Eicher
ECM Records albums
Instrumental albums
John Surman albums